TOTSE was a San Francisco Bay Area website and former BBS dedicated to storing text files on a variety of subjects and viewpoints, many of which were unusual or controversial. The name is an acronym for Temple of the Screaming Electron. 

The TOTSE forum has been described as part of the early "proto-troll" phenomenon, predating but overlapping with 4chan. It has also been compared to shock sites such as Rotten.com, Stile Project and Something Awful.

History
TOTSE was founded by the pseudonymous Jeff Hunter and J.C. Stanton. Jeff Hunter was a founding member of NIRVANAnet), which begain in 1989 as a dial-up BBS originally named "& the Temple of the Screaming Electron". The original &TOTSE specialized in small text files. Hunter had an old 8088 PC XT clone with limited hard drive space; small text files were the only data he could store in reasonable quantity. The identity of J.C. Stanton is even more obscure than that of Jeff Hunter; he is described as being an "intensely private person".

TOTSE became available on the Internet in 1997, and the dial-up BBS system was discontinued in the spring of 1998. TOTSE was closed on January 17, 2009, after a goodbye message was posted on the front page of the website by Jeff, thanking the users for the last 20 years. The website was considerably popular,  receiving 38,000,000 hits in February of 2003; averaging more than 89,000 hits per hour.

Text files
J.C. Stanton claimed that TOTSE was the largest text file repository on the internet. The text files spanned a wide range of controversial and criminal subject matter, and included numerous instruction manuals for making street drugs, particularly methamphetamine.

Media attention
TOTSE has been featured in the media, usually for members committing crimes or for its controversial text files. A 1993 article in the Contra Costa Times described TOTSE (and other NirvanaNet BBS nodes) as "an information network providing criminal insights to anyone with a phone, personal computer and modem... offer[ing] hundreds of files providing instructions on credit card fraud, money laundering, mail fraud, counterfeiting, drug smuggling, cable-tv theft, bomb-making and murder." Another feature was due to the "hacking" of an electronic parking lot sign in Crawley, England, designed to display the number of spaces left in each lot. The top two displays were replaced with "Fuck" and "Off", while the lower display read "totse".

The site also appears on a 2006 Australian anti-terrorism poster and a television advertisement.

A number of TOTSE members placed prank telephone calls to Live Prayer with Bill Keller starting on November 21, 2006. When another TOTSE member reported them to Keller via email, he threatened legal action against TOTSE, specifically stating that the prank calls amounted to "conspiracy to obstruct commerce". This raid resulted in procedural changes to the Live Prayer show, including a three-second delay for callers.

Community
The community of TOTSE was an Internet forum and IRC channel. Some users of the community referred to themselves as "Totseans". Members engaged in discussion about a wide variety of topics including but not limited to religion, sex, politics, poetry, humanities, weapons, explosives, drugs, illegal activities, technology, music, metaphysics, sub-culture activities, the environment, mechanics, food, and do it yourself projects. TOTSE is affectionately referred to by the users as &T, &TOTSE, and "The Temple". Although Hunter had an account he rarely posted on the TOTSE forums as himself. Before closing, Hunter stated that he conceived TOTSE as "a place where all types of ideas could be spoken, traded, and exchanged, where no topic was off-limits or forbidden" in the early days of the Internet; and, as demonstrated in the scope of TOTSE text file archive, he felt this was only a part of the community by 2009.

The forum software was running a highly modified version of UBB 5.47a, which has been heavily criticized by several readers due to its age. Hunter purchased a copy of vBulletin 3.12a, with the eventual upgrade occurring on April 4, 2007.

References

External links
 Totseans
 New Totse

Internet forums
1989 establishments in California
Internet properties established in 1997
Internet properties disestablished in 2009